Mariaville is an unincorporated community in Rock County, Nebraska, United States.

History
Mariaville had a post office between 1882 and 1957. The community was named for Harriet Maria Peacock, the first white child born in the area.

References

Unincorporated communities in Rock County, Nebraska
Unincorporated communities in Nebraska